Club Bàsquet Granollers is a professional basketball team based in Granollers, Catalonia, Spain, which currently plays in Copa Catalunya.

History
It was one of the historic teams of Liga Nacional and Liga ACB, where he played from 1977 to 1993, when it resigned to their place due to financial problems. In the 1985–86 season, the club played the Korać Cup.

In 1991 it changed its name to Granollers Esportiu Bàsquet after a merge with RCD Espanyol and played with it until 1993. After that, the professional club was dissolved and continued as Club Bàsquet Granollers.

Sponsorship naming
Areslux Granollers 1977–1984
Cacaolat Granollers 1984–1989
Grupo IFA Granollers 1989–1991
BFI Granollers 1992–1993

Season by season

References

External links
Official website
Profile at ACB.com
Profile at FEB.es
Profile at basquetcatala.cat

Catalan basketball teams
Former Liga ACB teams
Granollers